This article contains a list of fossil-bearing stratigraphic units in the state of Alaska, U.S.

Sites

See also

 Paleontology in Alaska

References

 

Stratigraphic Units
Alaska
Stratigraphic Units
Stratigraphy of Alaska
United States geology-related lists